Madhupur Assembly constituency   is an assembly constituency in  the Indian state of Jharkhand.

Overview
Madhupur Assembly constituency covers: Madhupur and Karon Police Stations and Kusmil, Chanddih, Pathra and Basbariya gram panchayats in Jasidih Police Station in Deoghar district.

Madhupur Assembly constituency is part of Godda (Lok Sabha constituency). It is also a part of Deogarh pranav.

Members of Legislative Assembly

Election Results

2021 by election

2019

2014

See also
Madhupur (community development block)
Karon
List of states of India by type of legislature

References

Assembly constituencies of Jharkhand